Artyom Vladimirovich Likhotnikov (born May 11, 1994) is a Kazakhstani professional ice hockey forward who is currently playing with Molot-Prikamie Perm in the Supreme Hockey League (VHL). He has formerly played with Barys Astana in the Kontinental Hockey League (KHL).

Career statistics

International

References

External links 

1994 births
Living people
Barys Nur-Sultan players
Kazakhstani ice hockey forwards
Nomad Astana players
People from Temirtau
Snezhnye Barsy players
Competitors at the 2019 Winter Universiade